Lahawin is an ethnic minority of Sudan. It likely numbers more than 100,000 persons. This minority mainly is Muslim. They speak Arabic. They lead a nomadic lifestyle. they are  residing along the river atbara down stream to north khashmalgirba they are no more a minority now  they are the 1st tribe who supported almahadi and form the nucleus of his fighting forces

References
Joshua Project

Ethnic groups in Sudan